The People’s Revolutionary Army (PRA) was the military of Grenada between 1979 and 1983.

History 
The PRA traces its roots to the National Liberation Army (NLA), which was formed in 1973 as the military wing of the insurgent New Jewel Movement (NJM) Party. In late 1977, the party dispatched 12 NLA leaders for four weeks of clandestine military training by a unit of the Guyana Defence Force. The group of 11 Grenadian men and one woman were known as "The 12 Apostles." They received intensive training in guerrilla tactics, weapons and other warfare skills in preparation for the overthrow of the government of Eric Gairy.

The near-bloodless coup occurred on the morning of March 13, 1979, on the orders of the NJM's Security and Defense Committee and under the tactical military leadership of key "Apostles." The armed takeover was popularly supported and subsequently became known as the Grenada Revolution.

After the New Jewel Movement party seized power, the Grenadian army was renamed the People's Revolutionary Army and expanded at a rapid pace. In January 1981, the revolutionary government formed the Revolutionary Armed Forces (PRAF), an umbrella organization that included the army, the militia, the police service, the prison service, the Coast Guard and the fire service. The Grenadian uniformed force far outnumbered the combined police and military of all their Eastern Caribbean neighbors. The Soviet Union and Cuba supplied most of the weapons. Promising soldiers and officers were trained in those countries. By 1983 the Movement was split over who should lead the party forward. Some believe the faction led by Prime Minister Maurice Bishop wanted closer ties with the West, while the faction led by Deputy Prime Minister Bernard Coard wanted to speed up the conversion to a communist state. Others contend the power struggle had more to do with leadership style and rivalry than differences in ideology between the two estranged friends.

On 13 October, the NJM's Central Committee placed Bishop under house arrest after he balked at a power-sharing agreement. Minister of Foreign Affairs Unison Whiteman returned from New York, where he was scheduled to address the United Nations, and instead began to negotiate with Coard for Bishop's release. Over the next few days, pro-Bishop demonstrations occurred throughout the island and a general strike was called in St. George's. On 18 October, demonstrators surged through the city chanting pro-Bishop and anti-Coard slogans while police and PRA soldiers watched. The protests reached a climax on 19 October. Whiteman addressed a growing crowd in the streets of St. George's. The crowd marched to Mount Wheldale to free Bishop from his home. At first, Bishop's guards held their ground and even fired warning shots. Eventually they were overwhelmed and the demonstrators freed Bishop. Bishop, Whiteman and the demonstrators then marched downhill to Fort Rupert to take over the headquarters for the People's Revolutionary Army by sheer weight of numbers.

The PRA leadership called in reinforcements, including 3 BTR-60s and additional troops. Shooting broke out at the fort under disputed circumstances. Three soldiers and eight civilians were killed in the ensuing melee, and about 100 civilians wounded, a 2003 study found. The PRA quickly rearrested Bishop, Whiteman, two other government ministers, a trade union leader and three Bishop supporters. These eight prisoners were subsequently executed by a firing squad of soldiers, bringing the total killed at the fort to 19. 

After Bishop's death, Hudson Austin established a Military Revolutionary Council composed entirely of 16 Army officers. Martial law was declared and 24-hour immediate curfew imposed. Violators were to be shot on sight, but none were. The curfew lasted four days and many prominent citizens were arrested. They included former Bishop officials, PRA officers and NJM members thought to be disloyal.

On 25 October 1983, the vanguard of 7,600 troops from the United States, and 350 from the Caribbean Peace Force, invaded Grenada, encountering resistance from the People's Revolutionary Army. On the morning before the invasion, the PRAF mustered a permanent force of 463 men, supplemented by 257 militia and 58 untrained NJM party members. The multinational intervention was also opposed by 636 armed Cuban construction workers under the leadership of 43 Cuban military advisers. The combat was occasionally intense for two days, but hostilities were declared ceased by U.S. forces on Nov. 2, 1983.

A Pentagon historical study of Operation Urgent Fury later reported: "US forces lost 19 killed and 116 wounded. Cuban forces lost 25 killed, 59 wounded and 638 captured. Grenadian forces suffered 45 killed and 358 wounded; at least 24 civilians killed."

By 27 October 1983, most of the Grenadian soldiers had either fled into the jungles or shed their military uniforms in an attempt to blend with the civilian population. Many of these soldiers were pointed out by their opponents to U.S. troops and arrested. The PRAF was disbanded and the island's police force was reconstituted and retrained.

In 1986, 18 Grenadians were tried by a Grenadian court for the 19 deaths that occurred at Ft. Rupert on Oct. 19, 1983. Seventeen defendants were convicted by a jury of murder or manslaughter, including eight PRA officers and three soldiers. All were imprisoned on the island while supporters waged a long-running campaign to free the so-called Grenada 17. The last of the 17 were released from Richmond Hill Prison in 2009 after serving up to 26 years in prison.

Equipment 
The military was mostly equipped with a mix of Soviet, Chinese, and Czechoslovak weapons and vehicles. They also confiscated some weapons from the American military.

Small arms and light weapons 
  Makarov PM semi-automatic pistol
  Tokarev TT-33 semi-automatic pistol
  CZ 52 semi-automatic pistol
  Uzi sub-machine gun
  Sa vz. 23 sub-machine gun
  Vz. 52 semi-automatic rifle
  Mosin–Nagant M44 carbine
  AKM assault rifle
  M16A1 assault rifle
  PKM machine gun
  Bren light machine gun
  Vz. 52 light machine gun
  DShK heavy machine gun
  Type 56 rocket propelled grenade launcher
  RPG-7 rocket propelled grenade launcher
  F1 hand grenade

Armoured vehicles 
  8 BTR-60
  2 BRDM-2
  T-55
  T-72
  15 PT-76

Anti-aircraft guns 
  12 ZU-23-2 anti-aircraft guns.

Artillery 
  4 Former Cuban ZiS-3 76.2mm Field guns (not used during the invasion)
  M1937 82mm mortar
  SPG-9 recoilless rifle
  Type 56 recoilless rifle

References

Bibliography

Further reading 
 Grenada 1983 by Lee E. Russell and M. Albert Mendez, 1985 Osprey Publishing Ltd.,

External links 
 the Grenada revolution Online

Communism in Grenada
Government of Grenada
Military of Grenada
Disbanded armies
Military units and formations established in 1979
Military units and formations disestablished in 1983
Grenada